Sphingomonas jinjuensis  is a Gram-negative and rod-shaped bacteria from the genus of Sphingomonas which has been isolated from rhizosphere soil from a rice field in Jinju in Korea.

References

Further reading

External links
Type strain of Sphingomonas jinjuensis at BacDive -  the Bacterial Diversity Metadatabase

jinjuensis
Bacteria described in 2011